Laugh Out Loud is a weekly comedy gag show that aired Saturday nights on ABS-CBN hosted by Luis Manzano who is well known for his character as Roldan in Komiks Presents: Flash Bomba. This show aired from December 4, 2010 to June 18, 2011.

Hosts 
Luis Manzano 
Alodia Gosiengfiao

See also 
List of programs broadcast by ABS-CBN

External links

ABS-CBN original programming
Philippine television sketch shows
2010 Philippine television series debuts
2011 Philippine television series endings
Filipino-language television shows